The Port Huron Flags were a minor league professional ice hockey team located in Port Huron, Michigan. The Flags competed in the International Hockey League between 1962 and 1981. For three of those seasons from 1971 to 1974, Port Huron was a farm team of the Detroit Red Wings, and were known as the Port Huron Wings. Port Huron won the International Hockey League playoff title, known as the Turner Cup, in 1966, 1971, and 1972.

Season-by-season results 
 Port Huron Flags, 1962–1971 and 1974–1981
 Port Huron Wings, 1971–1974

References 

Defunct ice hockey teams in the United States
Professional ice hockey teams in Michigan
Port Huron, Michigan
Ice hockey clubs established in 1962
Sports clubs disestablished in 1981
International Hockey League (1945–2001) teams
Kansas City Scouts minor league affiliates
New York Rangers minor league affiliates
St. Louis Blues minor league affiliates
Washington Capitals minor league affiliates
Buffalo Sabres minor league affiliates
1962 establishments in Michigan
1981 disestablishments in Michigan